The Monument to the Sunken Ships is the symbol of the city of Sevastopol, on the disputed Crimean peninsula. Located in Sevastopol Bay, it was designed by Amandus Adamson and built by Valentin Feldmann in 1905.

History 
The monument was erected in 1905 on the 50th anniversary of the Siege of Sevastopol, during the Crimean War, in which many ships of the Imperial Russian Navy were scuttled, most of them part of the Black Sea Fleet.

Symbol of the city 
On 12 February 1969, the monument was included in the coat of arms of Sevastopol, and on 12 April 2000 in the flag of Sevastopol.

Numismatics 
Since 2017 the monument appears on the obverse of the 200 banknote of Russian ruble. Previously in 2015 it appeared on the obverse of the 100 commemorative banknote of the Russian ruble dedicated to "the accession of the Republic of Crimea to the Russian Federation and formation of new constituent entities – the Republic of Crimea and the federal city of Sevastopol".

References 

Buildings and structures in Sevastopol
Monuments and memorials in Russia
Monuments and memorials in Ukraine
1905 sculptures
Objects of cultural heritage of Russia of federal significance
Cultural heritage monuments in Sevastopol